The  is a high-rise office building with integrated retail and restaurant facilities (which are also known as OTEMORI) located in the Otemachi business district in Chiyoda ward, Tokyo.

The 38-story tower serves as the headquarters of Mizuho Bank. A luxury hotel facility operated by Aman Resorts occupies the top six floors of the tower.

Overview
The tower replaces the previous 16-story Mizuho Bank Otemachi headquarters building. A major feature of this development is a 3,600-m2 green area named "Otemachi Forest" occupying one third of the site.
 
The building is situated above a nexus of five subway lines. The basement floors connect directly to Ōtemachi Station, as well as other nearby buildings.

References

External links 
 

Marunouchi
Skyscraper office buildings in Tokyo
Office buildings completed in 2014
Buildings and structures in Chiyoda, Tokyo
2014 establishments in Japan
Hotel buildings completed in 2014
Skyscraper hotels in Tokyo
Retail buildings in Tokyo
Kohn Pedersen Fox buildings